Shermans Dale is an unincorporated community in Carroll Township, Perry County, Pennsylvania, United States, along Sherman's Creek.  It was originally settled by Scots-Irish settlers before the American Revolutionary War.  Its ZIP code is 17090.

The public school that serves Shermans Dale is West Perry School District.

Religion
Mt. Gilead United Methodist Church is located here.
It is also the site of a former Presbyterian church with a pioneer graveyard.  Although this church is no longer used for weekly services, it is maintained for use for weddings and funerals.

Notable people
William Bigler (1814-1880), 12th Governor of Pennsylvania and a U.S. Senator for Pennsylvania
Darrell Horcher (born 1987), professional mixed martial artist who fought in  UFC,  Bellator and Cage Fury Fighting Championships
Alexander Kelly McClure (1828-1909), Pennsylvania State Senator for the 18th district in 1861 and the 4th district in 1873

References

Unincorporated communities in Pennsylvania
Unincorporated communities in Perry County, Pennsylvania